Novogorodka is a village in Ilansky District of Krasnoyarsk Krai, Russia. Population: .

References

Rural localities in Krasnoyarsk Krai
Ilansky District